Egon Schiele – Exzess und Bestrafung, also known as Egon Schiele – Excess and Punishment (English) and Egon Schiele, enfer et passion (French) is a 1980 film based on the life of the Austrian artist Egon Schiele. Set in Austria during the years immediately prior to and during the Great War, the film stars Mathieu Carriere as Schiele, with Jane Birkin as his muse Walburga (Wally) Neuzil, Christine Kaufmann as his wife Edith, and Kristina van Eyck as Edith's sister. Essentially a depiction of obsession and its constituents of sex, alcohol, and uncontrolled emotions, the film portrays Schiele as an agent of social change leading to the destruction of those he loves and ultimately of himself.

Plot
The short life of Austrian Expressionist painter Egon Schiele is chronicled against a backdrop of the final years of the Habsburg Monarchy. The story begins around 1912 as Schiele (Mathieu Carriere) and his mistress and artistic muse Wally (Jane Birkin) are befriended by an obsessed teenage girl (Karina Fallenstein), who has 
run away to be with Schiele. Schiele is subsequently imprisoned on the grounds that he has behaved in a sexually improper way towards the young woman. The young woman falsely accuses Schiele, who denies the charge to no avail. Although the girl withdraws her accusations, Schiele is nevertheless requested to leave the area, as he has offended the social mores of the conservative society in which he lives. Those offended include his mother (Angelika Hauff), who rails against his lax morals.

Upon his release, he continues his excesses, despite fighting (literally) to conform, even going so far as to volunteer for service in the Austrian army during World War I. As a soldier, Schiele cuts a pathetic figure and is quickly discharged as unfit for duty. He disposes of his alcoholic mistress and has an affair with a society beauty, who ultimately abandons him, unable to cope with his sexual obsessions. Schiele's emotional cruelty is exposed when he shuns Wally, who is near death. Their parting scene at a Vienna social gathering reveals the corruption at the heart of Schiele's artistic soul.

Schiele's paintings, however, develop greater depth as he pushes himself to the limit. Whilst his paintings gain acceptance (and many now hang in the Leopold Museum in Vienna), his own sanity suffers. He marries and appears to find a modicum of contentment until his wife Edith (Christine Kaufmann) falls ill during the 1918 Spanish influenza pandemic. Schiele makes love to his dying wife in a scene that is tender yet shocking, evoking a central theme of Schiele's work: the link between sex and death. Shortly thereafter, Schiele himself contracts influenza and dies.

Production

The film was an international co-production with actors of German, French, Dutch, and English origin. Although selected as the Austrian entry for the Best Foreign Language Film at the 53rd Academy Awards, it was not accepted as a nominee.

Cast
Mathieu Carrière – Egon Schiele
Jane Birkin – Wally Neuzil
Christine Kaufmann – Edith Harms
 –  Adele Harms
 – Tatjana von Mossig
 –   Gerti
Marcel Ophüls – Dr Stovel
 –  Benesch
  Danny Mann  – Mrs Stovel
Guido Weiland – Herr von Mossig
Maria Ebner – Frau Harms
Angelika Hauff – Frau Gertrude Schiele, Schiele's mother
Helmut Dohle – Gustav Klimt
Wolfgang Leisowsky – Arthur Roessler
Serge Gainsbourg – Unnamed

Reviews
New York Times review

See also
 List of submissions to the 53rd Academy Awards for Best Foreign Language Film
 List of Austrian submissions for the Academy Award for Best Foreign Language Film
 Egon Schiele: Death and the Maiden (2016)

References

External links
 

1980 films
1980s biographical films
French biographical films
Austrian biographical films
West German films
German biographical films
Biographical films about painters
Films directed by Herbert Vesely
Films set in Austria
Films set in the 1910s
1980s German-language films
Cultural depictions of 20th-century painters
Cultural depictions of Austrian men
German multilingual films
Austrian multilingual films
French multilingual films
1980s French films
1980s German films